Lisandro Martínez (born 18 January 1998) is an Argentine professional footballer who plays primarily as a centre-back for Premier League club Manchester United and the Argentina national team.

Martínez began his career at Newell's Old Boys before joining Defensa y Justicia in 2017, initially on loan. He signed for Ajax in 2019, where he made 120 appearances over three seasons and won two Eredivisie titles and one KNVB Cup. He won the Ajax Player of the Year award in the 2021–22 season.

Martínez represented Argentina at under-20 and under-23 levels, before making his senior international debut in March 2019. He was a member of the Argentina squads that won the 2021 Copa América, the 2022 Finalissima, and the 2022 FIFA World Cup.

Club career

Newell's Old Boys
Martínez had youth spells with Club Urquiza (Gualeguay, Entre Rios), Club Libertad (Gualeguay, Entre Rios) and Newell's Old Boys. He made his professional debut for Newell's in the club's final fixture of the 2016–17 season, when he played the full match in a loss to Godoy Cruz.

Defensa y Justicia
In August 2017, Martínez joined fellow Argentine Primera División side Defensa y Justicia on loan. His first appearance for Defensa arrived on 13 October in a defeat against San Lorenzo. Two appearances later, he scored his first senior goal in an away win versus Temperley. Defensa y Justicia purchased 50% of the rights to Martínez in June 2018.

Ajax
On 17 May 2019, Defensa y Justicia announced that a deal had been agreed with Eredivisie team Ajax; subject to the passing of a medical. Ajax paid the Argentine side €7m for the transfer of Martínez. Ajax announced the completion of the medical on 20 May, with the transfer to go through on 1 July. He penned a four-year contract, with the option of a further year. He didn't officially join until July, though did feature in June friendlies with Quick '20 and AaB. Before Ajax signed him, they tracked his progress for two-and-a-half years. His competitive bow came in the 2019 Johan Cruyff Shield against PSV Eindhoven, as Ajax won the trophy following a two-goal victory. He was voted man of the match in his second Eredivisie game; in a win over FC Emmen.

Martínez netted his first Ajax goal on 28 September, as he opened the scoring in a 2–0 victory over FC Groningen at the Johan Cruyff Arena. He scored again against Utrecht in November, in a campaign which was ended prematurely due to the COVID-19 pandemic. In his first match of 2020–21, Martínez got his third Ajax goal in a home win versus RKC Waalwijk on 20 September.

Manchester United
On 16 July 2022, it was announced that Manchester United had agreed a deal with Ajax for the signing of Martínez for a reported transfer fee between £47 million to £49 million, plus £8.5 million in add-ons. The transfer was officially completed on 27 July, when Martínez signed a five-year contract with the club. The next day, it was confirmed that he would wear the number six shirt last worn by Paul Pogba. On 7 August, Martínez made his club debut in a 2–1 home loss against Brighton & Hove Albion in the Premier League.

On 22 January 2023, Martínez scored his first goal for Manchester United in a 3–2 defeat against Arsenal at the Emirates Stadium. His first trophy came on 26 February 2023, with a win over Newcastle in the 2023 EFL Cup final.

International career
Martínez won four caps for the Argentina under-20 team at the 2017 South American Youth Football Championship in Ecuador. The first came during the first stage against Venezuela, while the other three arrived during the final stage as Argentina finished 4th and subsequently qualified for the 2017 FIFA U-20 World Cup in South Korea. He received a call-up for the U-20 World Cup but failed to make an appearance, appearing on the substitutes bench once versus Guinea. Martínez made one appearance for Argentina at under-23 level, which was in a 5–0 friendly victory against Bolivia in September 2019.

In March 2019, Martínez received his first call-up to the senior team. He won his opening cap as they lost in Madrid to Venezuela on 22 March. Martínez made one appearance at the 2021 Copa América, which Argentina won. He was an unused substitute in Argentina's 3–0 victory over Italy in the 2022 Finalissima. In November 2022, Martinez was selected in the final 26-man squad for Argentina at the 2022 FIFA World Cup. In the group stage, Martinez played the entire match as Argentina beat Mexico. On Dec 3, Martinez came off the bench against Australia in the Round of 16, making an important block on a shot by  Aziz Behich. Martinez was part of the starting XI against Netherlands in the quarter-finals and came off the bench against Croatia in the semis. In the final against title-holders France, he was an unused substitute as Argentina won 4–2 on penalties to win their third World Cup title.

Style of play
Martínez is nicknamed "the Butcher" due to his aggressive style of play. He is primarily a centre-back, though he is capable of playing at left-back and as a central midfielder, having played there at times for Defensa y Justicia and Ajax. He is a ball-playing centre-back and is known for his range of passing and composure on the ball. In the 2021–22 Eredivisie season, he averaged more passes per 90 minutes than any other player. Before signing him, Ajax's scouts characterised Martínez as a left-footed ball-playing defender who is "tough as nails" and possesses winning mentality. At Manchester United, his performances earned him comparisons to legendary former United defender Nemanja Vidić, with Vidić himself praising Martínez for his winning mentality and energy.

Career statistics

Club

International

Honours
Ajax
Eredivisie: 2020–21, 2021–22
KNVB Cup: 2020–21
Johan Cruyff Shield: 2019

Manchester United
EFL Cup: 2022–23

Argentina
FIFA World Cup: 2022
Copa América: 2021
CONMEBOL–UEFA Cup of Champions: 2022

Individual
Ajax Player of the Year (Rinus Michels Award): 2021–22

References

External links

Profile at the Manchester United F.C. website

1998 births
Living people
People from Gualeguay Department
Sportspeople from Entre Ríos Province
Argentine footballers
Association football defenders
Newell's Old Boys footballers
Defensa y Justicia footballers
AFC Ajax players
Manchester United F.C. players
Argentine Primera División players
Eredivisie players
Premier League players
Argentina youth international footballers
Argentina under-20 international footballers
Argentina international footballers
2021 Copa América players
2022 FIFA World Cup players
Copa América-winning players
FIFA World Cup-winning players
Argentine expatriate footballers
Expatriate footballers in England
Expatriate footballers in the Netherlands
Argentine expatriate sportspeople in England
Argentine expatriate sportspeople in the Netherlands